Besh o droM is a Balkan music group. Their music blends folk and contemporary instruments (including the cymbalom and the EWI, in styles ranging from punk-rock to world music. They acknowledge particular influences from Transylvanian, Jewish, Turkish, Afghan, Egyptian, Lebanese, Armenian, Bulgarian, Romanian, Macedonian and Greek musical traditions.

The band was formed in Budapest in August 1999, recently based in Budapest, Bristol and Jerusalem. Their Romany title in the Lovari dialect (Besh o droM means ’sit on the road’ literally), but its real meaning is ’follow your path, get on with it’. It is also wordplay in Hungarian meaning ’I am rolling...’ (a joint).

They have made a special appearance in Miklós Jancsó's movie Last Supper at the Arabian Gray Horse. They have also composed and performed the original soundtrack for the  National Theatre of Szeged's 2001/2002 season of A Midsummer Night's Dream.

Band members

Note: these Hungarian names appear in Eastern name order.

 Barcza Gergely (founder, 1999–) (EWI, saxophone, kaval, ney)
 Pettik Ádám (founder, 1999–) (darabuka drum, kanna (jug), drums, vocals)
 Herr Attila (2007–) bass guitar
 Seres Vilmos (2009–) clarinet, saxophone)
 Molnár Tamás Gergely (2012–) saxophone)
 Csurkulya József (1999–) (cimbalom)
 Kaszai Lili (2010–) (vocals)
 Hámori Máté (2009–) (guitar)
 Szumper Ákos (2019–) (drums)

Previous band members

 Sidoo Attila (1999–2009) (guitar)
 Tóth József (1999–2000) (saxophone)
 Orczy Géza (1999–2002) (tapan)
 Farkas Róbert (1999–2002) (accordion, violin)
 DJ Mango (2000–2001) (scratch, rap)
 Tóth Péter (2000–2006) (trumpet)
 Talabos Csaba (2002–2005) (tapan)
 Beszteri Róbert (2002–2003) (tapan)
 Molnár László (2000) (double bass)
 Szalóki Ágnes (1999–2005) (vocals)
 Bese Csaba (1999–2002) (bass guitar)
 Zsoldos Tamás (2002–2005) (bass guitar)
 Vajdovich Árpád (2005–2007) (bass guitar)
 Juhász Miczura Mónika (2005–2006) (vocals)
 Magyar Borbála (2007–2010) (vocals)
 Bede Péter (2000–2001) (saxophone)
 Monori András (2000) (trumpet)
 Békési László (2001–2007) (tenor saxophone, clarinet)
 Varga László (–2008) (percussion)
 Somos Péter (2008–2010) (drums)
 Vadász Páter (2010–2019) (drums)

Guest artist 
 Margit Bangó 2007 (vocals)

Discography

 Macsó hímzés (Macho Embroidery) Macsó hímzés (Fonó Records, 2000)
 Nekemtenemmutogatol (Can't Make Me!) (2002)
 GYI! (2004)
 Ha megfogom az ördögöt…  (Once I Catch The Devil) (2005)
 Kertünk alatt (Narrator records, 2011)
 Best of droM (Narrator records, 2012)
 Gyüttmenti Táncok EP (Self Release, 2016)
 Besh o droM20 (Fonó Records, 2020)

External links
 BeshodroM.hu Official website

References

Hungarian folk music groups